The 2000 Monte Carlo Rally (formally the 68th Rallye Automobile de Monte-Carlo) was the first round of the 2000 World Rally Championship. The race was held over three days between 20 January and 22 January 2000, and was won by Mitsubishi's Tommi Mäkinen, his 20th win in the World Rally Championship.

Background

Entry list

Itinerary
All dates and times are CET (UTC+1).

Results

Overall

World Rally Cars

Classification

Special stages

Championship standings

FIA Cup for Production Rally Drivers

Classification

Special stages

Championship standings

References

External links 
 Official website of the World Rally Championship

Monte Carlo
Monte Carlo Rally
Rally
Monte Carlo Rally